Chrysoritis brooksi, the Brook's opal, is a butterfly of the family Lycaenidae found only in South Africa.

The wingspan is 26–30 mm for males and 28–32 mm for females. Its flight period is from September to April, occasionally as late as June.

Larvae feed on Thesium and Zygophyllum species. They are associated with Crematogaster peringueyi ants.

Subspecies
Chrysoritis brooksi brooksi (South Africa: Western Cape Province)
Chrysoritis brooksi tearei (Dickson, 1966) (South Africa: Western Cape Province)

References

External links
insecte.org: images of this species

Butterflies described in 1938
Chrysoritis
Endemic butterflies of South Africa